Marco Bellich (born 5 May 1999) is an Italian professional footballer who plays as a centre back for  club Vicenza.

Club career
Born in Novara, Bellich started his career in local club Novara Calcio. He was promoted to the first team in 2017, and made his professional debut on Serie C, as a late substitute, on 16 March 2019 against Cuneo. He left the club in August 2021.

In August 2021, he joined Lucchese.

On 21 July 2022, Bellich signed a three-year contract with Vicenza.

References

External links
 
 

1999 births
Living people
People from Novara
Sportspeople from the Province of Novara
Footballers from Piedmont
Italian footballers
Association football defenders
Serie C players
Novara F.C. players
Genoa C.F.C. players
Lucchese 1905 players
L.R. Vicenza players